Jayden Joshua Joseph Mitchell-Lawson (born 17 September 1999) is an English footballer who plays as a midfielder or winger for Scottish Championship club Ayr United.

Early life
Mitchell-Lawson was born in Basingstoke.

Career

Derby County
Having started his career at Swindon Town's academy, Mitchell-Lawson joined Derby County in January 2016. Mitchell-Lawson made his senior debut on 13 March 2019, coming on as a substitute in the 83rd minute of a 0–0 draw with Stoke City.

Bristol Rovers (loan)
He joined Bristol Rovers on loan in January 2020. In his fifth match for the club, he scored his first senior goal, levelling the scores in impressive fashion in an eventual 3–1 defeat to Wycombe Wanderers. After a successful loan spell before the early postponement of the season, Mitchell-Lawson returned to the Gas on 8 August 2020, signing on loan for the season. After making just seven appearances since returning on loan, he returned to his parent club on 17 December 2020. He was released by Derby at the end of the 2020–21 season.

Swindon Town return
Mitchell-Lawson returned to Swindon Town on 19 August 2021 on a free transfer signing a one-year contract. Mitchell-Lawson was released at the end of the 2021–22 season following defeat in the EFL League Two play-offs.

Ayr United
Scottish Championship club Ayr United signed Mitchell-Lawson in June 2022, following his departure from Swindon Town.

Career statistics

References

1999 births
Living people
English footballers
Sportspeople from Basingstoke
Footballers from Hampshire
Association football midfielders
Derby County F.C. players
Bristol Rovers F.C. players
English Football League players
Swindon Town F.C. players
Ayr United F.C. players